Les Standiford is an author and, since 1985, the Founding Director of the Florida International University Creative Writing Program in Miami, Florida. He also holds the Peter Meinke Chair in Creative Writing at Eckerd College in St. Petersburg, Florida.

Although his most recent books have been narrative non-fiction historical works, his novels featuring the character "John Deal" put him in the Miami School of crime fiction, whose progenitors are Charles Willeford and John D. MacDonald, and which includes Elmore Leonard, Jeff Lindsay, Carl Hiaasen, James W. Hall, Paul Levine, Edna Buchanan, and Barbara Parker.

Standiford's students have included successful novelists Dennis Lehane, Barbara Parker, Vicki Hendricks, Ginny Rorby, and Neil Plakcy. According to Publishers Weekly, in 1976, while he was the chairman of the Creative Writing Program at the University of Texas El Paso, "Standiford gave Raymond Carver his first job ... when Carver was recovering from his infamous alcoholic crash and burn."

Education 
Standiford attended the Air Force Academy and the Columbia University School of Law, and holds a B.A. in Psychology from Muskingum College in Ohio and M.A. and Ph.D. degrees in Literature and Creative Writing from the University of Utah. He is a former screenwriting fellow and graduate of the American Film Institute in Los Angeles."

Awards and associations
According to the biography on his website, Standiford has been awarded the Barnes & Noble Discover Great New Writers Award, the Frank O'Connor Award for Short Fiction, a Florida Individual Artist Fellowship in Fiction, and a National Endowment for the Arts Fellowship in Fiction.  He is a member of the Associated Writing Programs, Mystery Writers of America, and the Writers Guild of America.

Personal life
Standiford's wife, Kimberly Kurzweil-Standiford, is a psychotherapist and  artist. They live in Pinecrest, Florida, and have three children.

Works

Historical narrative non-fiction 
 Coral Gables, The City Beautiful Story (1998)
 ''Opening Day: Or, the Return of Satchel Paige (2001)
 Last Train to Paradise: Henry Flagler and the Spectacular Rise and Fall of the Railroad that Crossed an Ocean. (2003)
 Meet You in Hell: Andrew Carnegie, Henry Clay Frick, and the Bitter Partnership That Transformed America. (2005)
 The Man Who Invented Christmas: How Charles Dickens's A Christmas Carol Rescued His Career and Revived Our Holiday Spirits. (2008)
 Washington Burning: How a Frenchman's Vision for Our Nation's Capital Survived Congress, the Founding Fathers, and the Invading British Army. (2008)
 Bringing Adam Home: The Abduction that Changed America., with Joe Matthews (2011)
 Water to the Angels: William Mulholland, His Monumental Aqueduct, and the Rise of Los Angeles (2015)
 Palm Beach, Mar-A-Lago, and the Rise of America's Xanadu (2019)

Novels 

John Deal Miami crime novels
 Done Deal (1993)
 Raw Deal (1994)
 Deal to Die For (1995)
 Deal on Ice (1997)
 Presidential Deal (1998)
 Black Mountain (2000)
 Deal With the Dead (2001)
 Bone Key (2002)
 Havana Run (2003)

Other novels
 Spill (1991)

Screenplays 
 Bones of Coral, written with James W. Hall, based on Hall's novel, purchased ny MGM-Pathé, but never produced
 Virus (1996) based on Standiford's 1991 novel Spill, starring Brian Bosworth directed by Allan A. Goldstein, shown on Showtime after its theatrical release

Short stories and articles 
According to the biography on his website, "Standiford's short stories and articles have appeared in a number of magazines and anthologies, including Kansas Quarterly, Writer's Digest, Fodor's Guide, Smoke Magazine, the Key West Reader, Confrontation, Three American Literatures (Modern Language Association), Perfect Lies: A Century of Classic Golf Fiction, and Communion: Contemporary Fiction Writers Reread the Bible. He has been a regular reviewer for The Miami Herald, Chicago Tribune, New York Newsday, and the New York Daily News."

Other 
 Miami, City of Dreams (1997) text for photo collection by Alan S. Maltz
 Naked Came The Manatee (1998) contributor to collective novel, with Dave Barry, Edna Buchanan, Elmore Leonard, others.
 The Putt At The End of The World (2000) collective novel, contributing editor, with Dave Barry, James W. Hall, others
 Miami Noir (2006) editor, short story collection

References

External links 
Official website
 

Year of birth missing (living people)
Living people
20th-century American novelists
21st-century American novelists
American crime fiction writers
21st-century American historians
American male novelists
Florida International University faculty
University of Texas at El Paso faculty
Writers from Miami
20th-century American male writers
21st-century American male writers
Novelists from Texas
Novelists from Florida
20th-century American non-fiction writers
21st-century American non-fiction writers
American male non-fiction writers
Historians from Florida
United States Air Force Academy alumni
Columbia Law School alumni
Muskingum University alumni
University of Utah alumni
Eckerd College faculty